Neolithodes duhameli is a species of king crab which is found in the Crozet Islands in the southwestern Indian Ocean from a depth of .

References 

King crabs
Crustaceans described in 2004
Crustaceans of the Indian Ocean
Fauna of the Crozet Islands